Himsworth is a surname. Notable people with the surname include:

Gary Himsworth (born 1969), English footballer
Harold Percival Himsworth (1905–1993), British scientist
Joyce Himsworth (1905–1989), British independent designer silversmith
William Alfred Himsworth (1820–1880), Canadian civil servant

See also
Hemsworth (surname)